KPI may refer to:

 Key performance indicator
 Kharkiv Polytechnic Institute
 Khulna Polytechnic Institute
 Kingpin inclination
 Indonesian Broadcasting Commission (Komisi Penyiaran Indonesia)
 Indonesian Broadcasting Commission Awards (Anugerah KPI)
 Kralyevich Productions
 Kryvyi Rih Pedagogical Institute
 Kuwait Petroleum International
 Kyiv Polytechnic Institute
KPi, an extension of Kripke–Platek set theory based on an inaccessible cardinal.
KPI, an extension of Kripke–Platek set theory based on limits of admissible sets.